Maher Charif (Arabic: ماهر الشريف, transliterated Mahir ash-Sharif) is a Palestinian Marxist historian specialising in modern Arab intellectual history and the history of Arab political movements. He is working as a lecturer and researcher on medieval, modern, and Arab history at the French Near East Institute in Syria.

Charif, a Palestinian refugee resident in Syria, has been a member of the Central Committee of the Palestinian People's Party, and is a frequent commentator on politics and society in Arab newspapers.

His works include:
Al-bahth 'an kiyan  (The Search for an Entity), on the ideological evolution of Palestinian political movements
Filastin fi-l-arshif as-sirri li-l-komintern (Palestine in the Secret Archive of the Comintern)
Rihanat an-nahda fi-l-fikr al-'arabi (The Stakes of the Nahda in Arab Thought)
Tayar al-islah ad-dini wa-masa'irihi fi-l-mujtama'at il-'arabiyya (The Religious Reformist Current and its Future in Arab Societies) conference papers, co-edited with Salam al-Kawakibi.
Tatawwur mafhoum al-jihad fi-l-fikr al-islami (The Development of the Concept of Jihad in Islamic Thought)

References

External links
"Maher Charif: construisons maintenant la paix" ("Maher Charif: Let Us Build Peace Now"). 14 Sep. 1993. Interview with Michel Muller in L'Humanité. (French)

Living people
Historians of the Middle East
Palestinian Marxist historians
Palestinian activists
21st-century Palestinian historians
Palestinian People's Party politicians
Year of birth missing (living people)